This is a list of United Nations Security Council Resolutions 2201 to 2300 adopted between 15 February 2015 and 26 July 2016.

See also 
 Lists of United Nations Security Council resolutions
 List of United Nations Security Council Resolutions 2101 to 2200
 List of United Nations Security Council Resolutions 2301 to 2400

References

2201